Q22 is a neomodern office skyscraper in Warsaw by the Polish real estate developer Echo Investment and designed by APA Kuryłowicz & Associates with collaboration from Buro Happold Polska. It replaces the Mercure Fryderyk Chopin hotel that occupied this site between 1991 and 2012.

Construction started in June 2013 and cleared the ground in October 2014.
The building was opened in October 2016.

Deloitte chose this building in late 2014 as its Polish headquarters.

See also
 List of tallest buildings in Poland

References

Śródmieście, Warsaw
Skyscraper office buildings in Warsaw
Buildings and structures completed in 2016